The 2017 TCR Benelux Touring Car Championship was the second season of the TCR Benelux Touring Car Championship. The season started on 22 April at Zolder and ended on 22 October at Assen. Stéphane Lémeret entered the season as the defending champion.

Teams and drivers
Michelin is the official tyre supplier.

TCR

S2 (Clio Cup Benelux)

Calendar and results
The 2017 schedule again consists of six rounds in the Benelux region, across Belgium and Netherlands. The round held in Luxembourg at the Circuit Goodyear did not return. Each round includes a qualifying session and five races: a 60-minute-long qualifying race with a mandatory driver change, and four 20-minute-long sprint races. The starting grid for the qualifying race will no longer be established by a popular vote via Facebook, through the Making the Grid application. But will be determined by a traditional qualifying session. Race 1 uses the fastest lap of after the pit stop during the qualifying race to determine the starting grid. Race 3 uses the fastest lap of before the pit stop during qualifying race. Races 2 and 4 include a rolling start using the finishing order, respectively, of Race 1 and 3. The calendar was announced on 25 September 2016, then revised on 15 December 2016.

All races will be run together with Clio Cup Benelux in separate classifications. Rounds 2, 4 and 6 are co-headlined by the GT & Prototype Challenge.

Drivers' championships
In sprint races both the competing driver and the co-driver that is not competing score points.

Junior class 
In contrast to the overall Drivers' championship only the driver competing scores points in sprint races.

Teams' championship 
Points toward the Teams' championship are only awarded in the qualifying race.

Cars' championship 
Points toward the Cars' championship are only awarded in the sprint races.

References

External links
 

BeNeLux Touring Car Championship
2017 in European sport